The Batsto River is a  tributary of the Mullica River in the southern New Jersey Pine Barrens in the United States. The river also drains 49.42 square miles of land.

Originating in Tabernacle Township, the Batsto River is joined by Skit Branch, Deep Run, Springer's Brook, Penn Swamp Branch and Goodwater Run before reaching Batsto Village where a dam forms Batsto Lake.  From Batsto Village, the stream continues on for a few miles before its confluence with the Mullica River at The Forks.

The Batsto River passes through multiple historic landmarks along its journey to the Mullica River.  These landmarks include Hampton furnace, Lower Forge and Quaker Bridge, each being places of small settlements at one time.

See also
Batsto Village
Wharton State Forest
List of rivers of New Jersey

References

External links
U.S. Geological Survey: NJ stream gaging stations

Tributaries of the Mullica River
Rivers of New Jersey
Rivers in the Pine Barrens (New Jersey)
Rivers of Burlington County, New Jersey